The 1950 European Rowing Championships were rowing championships held on the Idroscalo in the Italian city of Milan. The competition was for men only, they competed in all seven Olympic boat classes (M1x, M2x, M2-, M2+, M4-, M4+, M8+).

Background
With rowing officials from around the world coming to the regatta, the International Rowing Federation (FISA) held an ordinary congress on 30 August 1950 in Milan. It was at that congress that it was decided that women's rowing would be trialled. The first test event over the shorter agreed 1,000 m distance was run at the 1951 European Rowing Championships in Mâcon a day prior to the men's competition starting.

Medal summary – men's events

References

1950
European Championships
Rowing,European Championships,1950
Rowing,European Championships
Rowing,European Championships,1950